Archibald Knott (2 February 1916 – 16 April 1998) was an Australian rules footballer who played for the Fitzroy Football Club and St Kilda Football Club in the Victorian Football League (VFL).

Notes

External links 

1916 births
1998 deaths
Australian rules footballers from Victoria (Australia)
Fitzroy Football Club players
St Kilda Football Club players